Joanna Lin (born 20 February 2002) is an Australian rules footballer for the Collingwood Football Club's AFL Women's (AFLW) team. Lin played her first AFLW match on 6 February 2021 against Geelong, coming on as an interchange player. Lin kicked her first AFLW goal on 14 February 2021 in a match against the Richmond AFLW team.

Lin's family migrated from Taiwan to Australia. She was Collingwood's number 26 draft pick in the 2020 AFL Women's draft, selected from the Oakleigh Chargers.

Statistics
Statistics are correct to the end of the S7 (2022) season.

|- 
! scope="row" style="text-align:center" | 2021
|style="text-align:center;"|
| 20 || 9 || 3 || 1 || 29 || 24 || 53 || 8 || 12 || 0.3 || 0.1 || 3.2 || 2.7 || 5.9 || 0.9 || 1.3
|- 
! scope="row" style="text-align:center" | 2022
|style="text-align:center;"|
| 35 || 0 || — || — || — || — || — || — || — || — || — || — || — || — || — || —
|- 
! scope="row" style="text-align:center" | S7 (2022)
|style="text-align:center;"|
| 35 || 8 || 1 || 1 || 41 || 19 || 60 || 8 || 25 || 0.1 || 0.1 || 5.1 || 2.4 || 7.5 || 1.0 || 3.1
|- class="sortbottom"
! colspan=3| Career
! 17
! 4
! 2
! 70
! 43
! 113
! 16
! 37
! 0.2
! 0.1
! 4.1
! 2.5
! 6.6
! 0.9
! 2.2
|}

References

External links

Living people
2002 births
Collingwood Football Club (AFLW) players
Australian rules footballers from Victoria (Australia)
Australian people of Taiwanese descent